Wicklow RFC is an Irish rugby team based in Wicklow, Leinster, playing in Division 1A of the Leinster League.
Apart from the First XV (Junior 1), the club also fields a Second XV (Junior 2), Third XV (Anderson Cup), U19, U17, U15, U14, U13. Senior women 1st XV play in the AIL the top league in the country and 2nd team in Division 4a Leinster league. Girls U18, U16 and U14s sides and a mini-rugby section.

Honours
 Leinster Towns Cup: 1
 2015-16

References
 Wicklow RFC

Irish rugby union teams
Rugby clubs established in 1963
Rugby union clubs in County Wicklow
Wicklow (town)